Renato Florentino Pineda (born in 1964) is a Honduran physician and politician who is currently the Third Vice President of Honduras.

References 

Living people
1964 births
Honduran politicians
Honduran physicians
Liberty and Refoundation politicians
Vice presidents of Honduras